Atlético Etoile de Coléah is a Guinean football club from, Conakry, Guinea. The club is currently a member of the Guinée Championnat National, the top professional soccer league in Guinea. They play at Stade du 28 Septembre, which has a capacity of 35,000.

Their derby rivals are Eléphant de Coléah.

Achievements
Tournoi Ruski Alumini: 1
 2005

References 

Football clubs in Guinea